The 2021–22 season will be the 17th in the history of Melbourne Victory Football Club. This will be Melbourne Victory's 17th season in the A-League. In addition to the domestic league, Melbourne Victory will also participate in the FFA Cup.

Review

Background
Melbourne Victory's 2020–21 campaign had seen their first ever last-place finish in a league season, after they finished 12th forcing the club to play an FFA Cup Round of 32 play-off against ninth-placed Perth Glory. Before their 2021–22 season, Melbourne Victory announced on 19 April 2021 that Tony Popovic would be managing the club for three years.

Players

First team squad

Transfers

Transfers in

From youth squad

Transfers out

Contract extensions

Competitions

Pre-season and friendlies

Overview

A-League

League table

Matches 
The league fixtures were announced on 23 September 2021.

Finals series

FFA Cup

Preliminary rounds

Final rounds

AFC Champions League

Qualifying play-offs

See also
 2021–22 in Australian soccer
 List of Melbourne Victory FC seasons

References

External links
 Melbourne Victory official website

Melbourne Victory FC seasons
2021–22 A-League Men season by team